Farlowella paraguayensis is a species of armored catfish native to Brazil and Paraguay where it occurs in the Paraguay River basin.  This species grows to a length of  SL.

This small catfish fish has a long snout and a narrow, long body that resembles a twig, hence the common name of twig catfish.

It is available for sale as an aquarium fish and is said to be a peaceful fish that eats vegetable matter.  It needs clean well oxygenated water and a sand and gravel bed. It requires warm water between 22 and 27 deg C.

This species of cat fish had been seen 4 times on camera since 2019-11-14

References
 

paraguayensis
Fish of South America
Fish of Brazil
Fish of Paraguay
Fish described in 1997